Ferenc Puskás was a footballer who represented the Hungary national football team as a striker between 1945 and 1956. He scored his first international goal on 20 August 1945, during a Friendly match against Austria. Since then, he has become his country's top scorer in international football, and the joint-fifth overall men's international goalscorer in history, having scored 84 goals in 85 appearances for Hungary.

On 30 October 1946, Puskás scored his first international hat-trick against Luxembourg during a Friendly match. He has scored five international hat-tricks, and on one occasion, four international goals in a single match, on 24 September 1950, during a Friendly match against Albania.

International goals
As of 14 October 1956
Hungary score listed first, score column indicates score after each Puskás goal.

(* Non-FIFA match)

Hat-tricks

Statistics

References 

Puskas, Ferenc
Puskas
Puskás